Calobota is a genus of flowering plants in the legume family, Fabaceae. It belongs to the subfamily Faboideae.

Species
Calobota comprises the following species:
 Calobota acanthoclada (Dinter) Boatwr. and B-E.Van Wyk
 Calobota angustifolia (E. Mey.) Boatwr. & B.-E. van Wyk
 Calobota cinerea (E. Mey.) Boatwr. & B.-E. van Wyk
 Calobota cuspidosa (Burch.) Boatwr. & B.-E. van Wyk
 Calobota cytisoides (Berg.) Eckl. and Zeyh.
 Calobota elongata (Thunb.) Boatwr. and B-E.Van Wyk
 Calobota halenbergensis (Merxm. & A.Schreib.) Boatwr. & B.-E. van Wyk
 Calobota linearifolia (E. Mey.) Boatwr. & B.-E. van Wyk
 Calobota lotononoides (Schltr.) Boatwr. and B-E.Van Wyk
 Calobota obovata (Schinz) Boatwr. and B-E.Van Wyk
 Calobota psiloloba (E. Mey.) Boatwr. & B.-E. van Wyk
 Calobota pungens (Thunb.) Boatwr. & B.-E. van Wyk
 Calobota saharae (Coss. & Dur.) Boatwr. & B.-E. van Wyk
 Calobota sericea (Thunb.) Boatwr. & B.-E. van Wyk
 Calobota spinescens (Harv.) Boatwr. & B.-E. van Wyk

References

Crotalarieae
Fabaceae genera